The 1899 Indiana Hoosiers football team was an American football team that represented Indiana University Bloomington during the 1899 college football season. In their second season under head coach James H. Horne, the Hoosiers compiled a 6–2 record and outscored their opponents by a combined total of 133 to 33.

Schedule

References

Indiana
Indiana Hoosiers football seasons
Indiana Hoosiers football